Eupithecia hemiochra is a moth in the  family Geometridae. It is found in Kenya.

References

Endemic moths of Kenya
Moths described in 1932
hemiochra
Moths of Africa